Thomas Geierspichler (born April 14, 1976) is a Paralympic wheelchair racer from Austria. He competes in the T52 classification.

Biography
He competed in the 2000 Summer Paralympics in Sydney, Australia.  There he won a bronze medal in the men's Marathon - T52 event, went out in the first round of the men's 800 metres - T52 event, finished sixth in the men's 1500 metres - T52 event and finished eighth in the men's 5000 metres - T52 event.  He also competed at the 2004 Summer Paralympics in Athens, Greece.    There he won a gold medal in the men's 1500 metres - T52 event, a silver medal in the men's 800 metres - T52 event, a silver medal in the men's 5000 metres - T52 event, a silver medal in the men's Marathon - T52 event and a bronze medal in the men's 400 metres - T52 event.  He also competed at the 2008 Summer Paralympics in Beijing, China.    There he won a gold medal in the men's Marathon - T52 event, a bronze medal in the men's 800 metres - T52 event, finished fifth in the men's 200 metres - T52 event and finished fourth in the men's 400 metres - T52 event

, he holds T52 world records for 10000m and marathon distances.

References

External links
 Official Website (english)
 

Paralympic athletes of Austria
Athletes (track and field) at the 2000 Summer Paralympics
Athletes (track and field) at the 2004 Summer Paralympics
Athletes (track and field) at the 2008 Summer Paralympics
Paralympic gold medalists for Austria
Paralympic silver medalists for Austria
Paralympic bronze medalists for Austria
Austrian male wheelchair racers
Living people
World record holders in Paralympic athletics
1976 births
Paralympic wheelchair racers
Athletes (track and field) at the 2012 Summer Paralympics
Medalists at the 2000 Summer Paralympics
Medalists at the 2004 Summer Paralympics
Medalists at the 2008 Summer Paralympics
Medalists at the 2012 Summer Paralympics
Paralympic medalists in athletics (track and field)
Medalists at the World Para Athletics European Championships
21st-century Austrian people